This is a list of nationwide public opinion polls that were conducted relating to the general election for the 2024 United States presidential election. The people named in the polls are declared candidates or have received media speculation about their possible candidacy.

Polling aggregations

Joe Biden vs. Donald Trump

Joe Biden vs. Ron DeSantis

Kamala Harris vs. Donald Trump

National poll results

Joe Biden vs. Donald Trump

Joe Biden vs. Donald Trump vs. Andrew Yang

Joe Biden vs. Donald Trump with Liz Cheney as an independent

Joe Biden vs. Ron DeSantis

Joe Biden vs. Ron DeSantis with Donald Trump as an independent

Joe Biden vs. Ted Cruz

Joe Biden vs. Nikki Haley

Joe Biden vs. Mitt Romney

Joe Biden vs. Mike Pence

Joe Biden vs. Liz Cheney

Joe Biden vs. Chris Christie

Joe Biden vs. Tom Cotton

Joe Biden vs. Josh Hawley

Joe Biden vs. Larry Hogan

Joe Biden vs. Kristi Noem

Joe Biden vs. Mike Pompeo

Joe Biden vs. Marco Rubio

Joe Biden vs. Rick Scott

Joe Biden vs. Tim Scott

Joe Biden vs. generic Republican

Kamala Harris vs. Donald Trump

Kamala Harris vs. Ron DeSantis

Kamala Harris vs. Mike Pence

Kamala Harris vs. Mike Pompeo

Kamala Harris vs. Tim Scott

Pete Buttigieg vs. Donald Trump

Hillary Clinton vs. Donald Trump

Bernie Sanders vs. Donald Trump

Phil Murphy vs. Donald Trump

Gavin Newsom vs. Donald Trump

Gavin Newsom vs. Ron DeSantis

Jerome Segal vs. Donald Trump

Elizabeth Warren vs. Donald Trump

See also

 2024 United States elections
 Statewide opinion polling for the 2024 United States presidential election
 2024 United States gubernatorial elections
 2024 United States House of Representatives elections
 2024 United States Senate elections

Notes

References

External links
 Live Polling
 Polling Report